The 1987 Florida State Seminoles baseball team represented Florida State University in the 1987 NCAA Division I baseball season. The Seminoles played their home games at Seminole Stadium. The team was coached by Mike Martin in his eighth season as head coach at Florida State.

The Seminoles reached the College World Series, their ninth appearance in Omaha, where they finished tied for fifth place after recording a win against  and losses to eventual semifinalists  and Texas.

Personnel

Roster

Coaches

Schedule and results

References

Florida State Seminoles baseball seasons
Florida State Seminoles
College World Series seasons
Florida State Seminoles baseball